The Switzerland men's national ball hockey team is the men's national ball hockey team of Switzerland, and a member of the International Street and Ball Hockey Federation (ISBHF).

World Championships

External links 
http://www.ssha.ch/
 ISBHF Official Site

Ball hockey
Ball hockey
Men's sport in Switzerland